Giade is a Local Government Area of Bauchi State, Nigeria. Its headquarters are in the town of Giade. "It's become local government in 1996" edited by BUHARI SANI 

It has an area of 668 km and a population of 156,969 at the 2006 census.

The postal code of the area is 750.

References

Local Government Areas in Bauchi State